The 2005 Estoril Open was a tennis tournament played on outdoor clay courts. This event was the 16th edition of the Estoril Open for the men (the 9th for the women), included in the 2005 ATP Tour International Series and in the 2005 WTA Tour Tier IV Series. Both the men's and the women's events took place at the Estoril Court Central, in Oeiras, Portugal, from 25 April through 1 May 2005. Gastón Gaudio and Lucie Šafářová won the singles titles.

Finals

Men's singles

 Gastón Gaudio defeated  Tommy Robredo, 6–1, 2–6, 6–1

Women's singles

 Lucie Šafářová defeated  Li Na, 6–7(4–7) 6–4, 6–3

Men's doubles

 František Čermák /  Leoš Friedl defeated  Juan Ignacio Chela /  Tommy Robredo, 6–3, 6–4

Women's doubles

 Li Ting /  Sun Tiantian defeated  Michaëlla Krajicek /  Henrieta Nagyová, 6–3, 6–1

External links
Official website
Men's Singles Draw
Men's Doubles Draw
Men's Qualifying Singles Draw
Women's Singles, Doubles and Qualifying Singles Draws

 
April 2005 sports events in Europe
May 2005 sports events in Europe